Cuthonellidae is a family of sea slugs, aeolid nudibranchs, marine gastropod molluscs in the superfamily Fionoidea.

Taxonomic history
This family was reinstated as a result of a molecular phylogenetics study.

Genera 
Genera within the family Cuthonellidae include:
Cuthonella Bergh, 1884

References

External links